The Iceberg Skating Palace (Russian: Дворец Зимнего Спорта Айсберг) is a 12,000-seat multi-purpose arena at Sochi Olympic Park in Sochi, Russia. The venue hosted the figure skating and short track speed skating events at the 2014 Winter Olympics. It cost $43.9 million, including the temporary works for the Olympics. 15,000 tonnes of steel were used. The environment was taken into consideration in its construction.

A local figure skating competition was held in October 2012 but the International Skating Union said more work was needed to be ready for the 2012–2013 Grand Prix of Figure Skating Final, a test event in December 2012. At the Grand Prix Final, competitors said they liked the venue but some spectators complained about handrails obstructing the view in the upper tier. It takes about two hours to adjust the ice when switching from figure skating to short track or vice versa.

Plans had originally existed for the arena to converted into a cycling velodrome following the Olympics.

See also
 List of indoor arenas in Russia

References

External links 

Venue models from Sochi Investment Forum 2009
Ice Arena information and images
Arena information and drawings
Sochi2014.com profile

Indoor arenas in Russia
Sport in Sochi
Venues of the 2014 Winter Olympics
Olympic figure skating venues
Olympic short track speed skating venues
Adlersky City District
Buildings and structures in Sochi